The New Beginning (2013) was a professional wrestling pay-per-view (PPV) promoted by New Japan Pro-Wrestling (NJPW). The event took place on February 10, 2013, in Hiroshima, Hiroshima, at the Hiroshima Sun Plaza Hall. The event featured nine matches, four of which were contested for championships. It was the fourth event under the New Beginning name.

Storylines
The New Beginning featured ten professional wrestling matches that involved different wrestlers from pre-existing scripted feuds and storylines. Wrestlers portrayed villains, heroes, or less distinguishable characters in the scripted events that built tension and culminated in a wrestling match or series of matches.

Event
All four champions were successful in their defenses. Time Splitters (Alex Shelley and Kushida) successfully defended the IWGP Junior Heavyweight Tag Team Championship against the previous champions, Forever Hooligans (Alex Koslov and Rocky Romero), Prince Devitt successfully defended the IWGP Junior Heavyweight Championship against Apollo 55 partner Ryusuke Taguchi, K.E.S. (Davey Boy Smith Jr. and Lance Archer) successfully defended the IWGP Tag Team Championship against previous champions, Tencozy (Hiroyoshi Tenzan and Satoshi Kojima), and Hiroshi Tanahashi defeated Karl Anderson for his seventh successful defense of the IWGP Heavyweight Championship.

Results

References

External links
The official New Japan Pro-Wrestling website

2013
2013 in professional wrestling
February 2013 events in Japan